Malediction may also refer to:
 Curse, wish that some form of adversity or unhappiness befall another person 
 Malediction (EP), a 1993 EP by Einstürzende Neubauten
 Malédiction, a work for piano and string orchestra by Franz Liszt
 The Malediction, a 1952 novel by Jean Giono

See also
 La malédiction, a 1991 adventure video game